Nikola Čavlina (born 2 June 2002) is a Croatian professional football player who plays as a goalkeeper for Lokomotiva Zagreb.

Club career
In September 2020, Čavlina signed a professional contract with Dinamo Zagreb.

International career 
He has been capped for various Croatian youth national teams.

Personal life 
Nikola's father is Silvije Čavlina.

References

External links

2002 births
Living people
Footballers from Zagreb
Association football goalkeepers
Croatian footballers
Croatia youth international footballers
GNK Dinamo Zagreb II players
GNK Dinamo Zagreb players
First Football League (Croatia) players